Events in the year 2007 in Liechtenstein.

Incumbents 
 Prince: Hans-Adam II
 Regent: Alois
 Prime Minister: Otmar Hasler

Events 
 28 January – The 2007 Liechtenstein local elections take place, which elected the municipal councils and mayors of the eleven municipalities.
 February – Hundreds of people, mainly from the nations of Somalia and Eritrea, attempt to seek asylum in the nation. Border guards are stationed on the Switzerland and Austria border to combat the number of incoming asylum seekers, with the main objective of maintaining law and order for all Liechtensteiners. This measure lasts for about 90 days, with over 800 people seeking asylum in the nation in this time.
 1 March – A company of 171 Swiss soldiers mistakenly enter the nation during a training exercise due to bad weather conditions.
 1 July – The nations first two consuls are appointed to represent Liechtenstein in the United States with one in Macon, Georgia and the other in Los Angeles, California.

Sports

2006–07 Liechtenstein Cup

Semi-finals 
 7 April – USV Eschen/Mauren II 0 - 2 FC Ruggell
 11 April – FC Vaduz 3 – 1 USV Eschen/Mauren

Finals 
 1 May – FC Vaduz 8 – 0 FC Ruggell

2007–08 Liechtenstein Cup

First round 
 11 August
 FC Ruggell II 0 – 1 FC Balzers III
 FC Triesenberg II 0 – 6 FC Schaan II
 12 August – FC Vaduz III 1 – 5 FC Triesen
 22 August – FC Triesen II 0 – 2 FC Vaduz II

Second round 
 18 September
 FC Balzers II 2 – 1 FC Triesenberg
 FC Triesen 0 – 4 FC Schaan
 19 September
 FC Balzers III 0 – 6 FC Schaan II
 FC Vaduz II 0 – 10 FC Balzers

Quarter-finals 
 23 October – FC Schaan II 0 – 5 FC Vaduz
 30 October – FC Ruggell 1 – 0 FC Balzers II
 31 October – FC Schaan 1 – 4 USV Eschen/Mauren
 7 November – USV Eschen/Mauren II 0 – 8 FC Balzers

UEFA Euro 2008 qualifying 
 24 March – Liechtenstein  1 – 4  Northern Ireland
 28 March – Liechtenstein  1 – 0  Latvia
 2 June – Iceland  1 – 1  Liechtenstein
 6 June – Liechtenstein  0 – 2  Spain
 22 August – Northern Ireland  3 – 1  Liechtenstein
 12 September – Denmark  4 – 0  Liechtenstein
 13 October – Liechtenstein  0 – 3  Sweden
 17 October – Liechtenstein  3 – 0  Iceland
 17 November – Latvia  4 – 1  Liechtenstein

Deaths

See also 

 2007 in Europe
 City states

References 

 
2000s in Liechtenstein
Years of the 21st century in Liechtenstein
Liechtenstein
Liechtenstein